Albert Griffiths may refer to:
Albert Griffiths (1871–1927), Australian boxer, better known as Young Griffo
Albert Griffiths (trade unionist) (1908–1970), ASLEF General Secretary 1964–70
Albert Griffiths (reggae artist), Jamaican singer, founder of The Gladiators